Cedar City is the largest city in Iron County, Utah, United States. It is the home of Southern Utah University, the Utah Shakespeare Festival, the Utah Summer Games, the Simon Fest Theatre Co., and other events. As of the 2020 census the city had a population of 35,235, up from 28,857 in the 2010 census.

History

The presence of prehistoric people in the Cedar City area is revealed by rock art found in Parowan Gap to the north and Fremont sites dated to A.D. 1000 and 1300. Ancestors of the present-day Southern Paiute people met the Domínguez–Escalante expedition in this area in 1776. Fifty years later, in 1826, mountain man and fur trader Jedediah Smith traveled through the area, exploring a route from Utah to California.

Cedar City was originally settled in late 1851 by Mormon pioneers originating from Parowan, Utah, who were sent to build an iron works. Two companies of men led by Henry Lunt reached the fort site in a blizzard on November 11, 1851, making that date the official founding. In 1855, a new site, closer to the iron works and out of the flood plain of Coal Creek, was established at the suggestion of Brigham Young. A furnace operated from September 1852 for three years, producing about 25 tons of pig iron, using iron ore deposits located in the Iron Mountain District. 

Cedar City was incorporated on February 18, 1868.

The iron works closed in 1858, though mining continued in the area until the 1980s. The completion of a railroad connection to Cedar City in 1923 established the area as a tourism gateway to nearby Bryce Canyon National Park, Zion National Park, Grand Canyon National Park, and Cedar Breaks National Monument. Cedar City continues to be a center of tourism, commercial development, education, and the arts in southwestern Utah.

The city has shared in the rapid growth of much of southwestern Utah since the late 1980s.

In 2017 the Cedar City Utah Temple was dedicated.

Geography and climate

Its elevation of  gives it a somewhat cooler climate compared to the nearby St. George region, though it retains cultural ties to the city —for example, they share a daily newspaper.

In some of the older neighborhoods in the city, an irrigation system is utilized by many residents for their lawns and gardens, as "water is diverted from a natural stream (Coal Creek) into a series of canals and ditches for residential flood irrigation."

The city is located on the western edge of the Markagunt Plateau, in a high desert valley, Cedar Valley, with no ocean drainage.

Demographics 

As of the census of 2000, there were 20,527 people, 6,486 households, and 4,682 families residing in the city. The population density was 1,021.8 people per square mile (394.5/km). There were 7,109 housing units at an average density of 353.9 per square mile (136.6/km). The racial makeup of the city was 92.06% White, 2.53% African American, 1.11% Native American, 0.47% Asian, 0.33% Pacific Islander, 1.65% from other races, and 1.86% from two or more races. Hispanic or Latino of any race were 4.14% of the population.

There were 6,486 households, out of which 39.0% had children under the age of 18 living with them, 59.8% were married couples living together, 9.1% had a female householder with no husband present, and 27.8% were non-families. 16.3% of all households were made up of individuals, and 5.8% had someone living alone who was 65 years of age or older. The average household size was 3.07 and the average family size was 3.37.

In the city, the population was spread out, with 28.2% under the age of 18, 27.4% from 18 to 24, 22.6% from 25 to 44, 14.0% from 45 to 64, and 7.8% who were 65 years of age or older. The median age was 23 years. For every 100 females, there were 95.6 males. For every 100 females age 18 and over, there were 91.0 males..

The median income for a household in the city was $32,403, and the median income for a family was $37,509. Males had a median income of $31,192 versus $19,601 for females. The per capita income for the city was $14,057. About 14.5% of the families and 22.1% of the population were below the poverty line, including 20.2% of those under the age of 18 and 4.2% of those 65 and older.

Education

Cedar City is served by the Iron County School District.

Cedar City is home of two High Schools, Cedar High School and Canyon View High School.

Cedar City is home to Southern Utah University.

Economy

The economy is mostly centered on a small manufacturing hub, tourism, Southern Utah University, and home construction. The largest employers in Cedar City (2019 data) are listed below.

Notable people 

 Christine Cavanaugh (1963–2014), voice actress in Dexter's Laboratory and Rugrats 
 Lamar Clark, boxer
 Ally Condie, author of the best-selling Matched series and the book Atlantia; born in Cedar City
 Melvin Dummar (1944-2018), claimed to be an heir of Howard Hughes; born in Cedar City
 Riley Griffiths, teenage actor best known for his role in the 2011 film Super 8; born in Cedar City
 Nadine Hansen, website Mormonsfor8.com founder
 Mike Leavitt, former governor of Utah, former administrator of the United States Environmental Protection Agency, and former secretary of the U.S. Department of Health and Human Services; born and educated in Cedar City
 L. E. Modesitt Jr., science fiction and fantasy author; lives in Cedar City
 Doug Murdoch, professor at Southern Utah University Educator born in Florida
 Del Parson, artist most known for his depictions of Jesus Christ; lives in Cedar City
 Helen Foster Snow, journalist who reported from China in the 1930s under the name "Nym Wales" on the developing revolution in China and the Korean independence movement; born in Cedar City. There is currently a statue of her at the intersection of Main Street and 200 North.
 Mitch Talbot, professional baseball player in Major League Baseball as a pitcher; born in Cedar City

Transportation

Interstate 15 connects the city with St. George (50 miles) and Las Vegas (170 miles) to the southwest, and to Interstate 70 (75 miles) and Salt Lake City (250 miles) to the north. State roads connect Cedar City with Panaca, Nevada, near US 93 (80 miles); and to Kanab, via US-89 (80 miles). Similar to St. George, the city enjoys an excellent location on the West's regional transportation network.

A branch line of the Union Pacific Railroad serves customers on the city's western outskirts. The branch connects to the railway's main line at Lund.

Cedar City Regional Airport offers flights via Delta Connection.

Cedar City is served by a local bus system.

See also

 List of cities and towns in Utah
 Dixie National Forest
 Groovefest American Music Festival
Cedar City Regional Airport

References

 Seegmiller, Janet Burton.  A History of Iron County: Community Above Self.  Salt Lake City, UT: Iron County Commission and Utah State Historical Society, 1997.

External links

 
 Vist Cedar City · Brian Head 
 Cedar City Chamber of Commerce
 Cedar City Photos in Sherratt Library Digital Collection, old photos of Cedar City including Main Street, aerials, and mining operations

 
Cities in Utah
Populated places established in 1851
1851 establishments in Utah Territory
Cities in Iron County, Utah